Acima is a supermarket chain in Morocco. It is part of the Marjane Groupe and is 100% owned by the SNI, the holding company of Mohammed VI. 

Acima was created in 2002 in partnership with Auchan, but in 2007 ONA Group (today known as the SNI) took over the business entirely.

References

External links
Acima.ma

Supermarkets of Morocco
Société Nationale d'Investissement
Retail companies of Morocco
ONA Group